

Leaders of KaNgwane

See also
Bantustan
President of South Africa
State President of South Africa
List of prime ministers of South Africa
Governor-General of the Union of South Africa
Apartheid
List of historical unrecognized states and dependencies

KaNgwane, Chief Ministers
Chief Ministers of KaNgwane